Cytochrome c oxidase assembly factor 6 is a protein that in humans is encoded by the COA6 gene. Mitochondrial respiratory chain Complex IV, or cytochrome c oxidase, is the component of the respiratory chain that catalyzes the transfer of electrons from intermembrane space cytochrome c to molecular oxygen in the matrix and as a consequence contributes to the proton gradient involved in mitochondrial ATP synthesis. The COA6 gene encodes an assembly factor for mitochondrial complex IV and is a member of the cytochrome c oxidase subunit 6B family. This protein is located in the intermembrane space, associating with SCO2 and COX2. It stabilizes newly formed COX2 and is part of the mitochondrial copper relay system. Mutations in this gene result in fatal infantile cardioencephalomyopathy.

Structure 
The COA6 gene is located on the q arm of chromosome 1 in position 42.2 and spans 10,612 base pairs. The gene produces a 14.1 kDa protein composed of 125 amino acids. The COA6 protein is found a complex with TMEM177, COX20, MT-/COX2, COX18, SCO1 and SCO2. The protein has a CX9CXnCX10C motif and a CHCH domain, which hints that the protein is most likely a redox protein rather than a copper metallochaperone.

Function 
The COA6 encodes a protein which is an assembly factor for Complex IV. This protein is specifically required for COX2 biogenesis and stability; the absence of this protein will cause fast turnover of newly synthesized COX2.The presence of a CHCH domain facilitates its function as a thiol-disulfide reductant as it facilitates the transfer of copper from SCO1 to COX2.

Clinical Significance 
Two mutations have been identified in this protein: W66R and W59C. The latter mutation results in the protein being mistargeted to the mitochondrial matrix, resulting in the loss of interaction with SCO2 and COX2. Inheritance of this mutation is autosomal recessive and results in a phenotype of fatal infantile cardioencephalomyopathy due to Complex IV deficiency. Symptoms include hypertrophic cardiomyopathy, left ventricular non-compaction, lactic acidosis, and metabolic hypotonia.

Interactions 
This protein interacts transiently with the copper-containing catalytic domain of newly synthesized COX2 via its C-terminal tail exposed to the intermembrane space. It also interacts selectively with the copper metallochaperone SCO2 in a COX2-dependent manner and with COX20 in a COX2- and COX18-dependent manner. Additionally, this protein interacts with COA1, SCO1, COX16, TTC19, DTX2, NADSYN1, GABARAP, AIFM1, COX4I1, CD81, COX14, SFXN1, and PLGRKT.

References

Further reading